The Province of Lower Canada was a British colony on the lower Saint Lawrence River and the shores of the Gulf of Saint Lawrence (1791–1841). It covered the southern portion of the current Province of Quebec and the Labrador region of the current Province of Newfoundland and Labrador (until the Labrador region was transferred to Newfoundland in 1809).

Lower Canada consisted of part of the former colony of Canada of New France, conquered by Great Britain in the Seven Years' War ending in 1763 (also called the French and Indian War in the United States). Other parts of New France conquered by Britain became the Colonies of Nova Scotia, New Brunswick, and Prince Edward Island.

The Province of Lower Canada was created by the Constitutional Act 1791 from the partition of the British colony of the Province of Quebec (1763–1791) into the Province of Lower Canada and the Province of Upper Canada. The prefix "lower" in its name refers to its geographic position farther downriver from the headwaters of the St. Lawrence River than its contemporary Upper Canada, present-day southern Ontario.

Lower Canada was abolished in 1841 when it  and adjacent Upper Canada were united into the Province of Canada.

Rebellion

Like Upper Canada, there was significant political unrest. Twenty-two years after an invasion by the United States in the War of 1812, a rebellion now challenged the British rule of the predominantly French population. After the Patriote Rebellion in the Rebellions of 1837–1838 was suppressed by government troops and Loyal volunteers, the 1791 Constitution was suspended on 27 March 1838 and a special council was appointed to administer the colony. An abortive attempt by revolutionary Robert Nelson to declare a Republic of Lower Canada was quickly thwarted.

The provinces of Lower Canada and Upper Canada were combined as the United Province of Canada in 1841, when the Act of Union 1840 came into force. Their separate legislatures were combined into a single parliament with equal representation for both constituent parts, even though Lower Canada had a greater population.

Constitution

The Province of Lower Canada inherited the mixed set of French and English institutions that existed in the Province of Quebec during the 1763–1791 period and which continued to exist later in Canada-East (1841–1867) and ultimately in the current Province of Quebec (since 1867).

Population
Lower Canada was populated mainly by Canadiens, an ethnic group who trace their ancestry to French colonists who settled in Canada from the 17th century onward.

Transportation

Travelling around Lower Canada was mainly by water along the St. Lawrence River. On land the only long-distance route was the Chemin du Roy or King's Highway, built in the 1730s by New France. The King's Highway was, in addition to the mail route, the primary means of long-distance passenger travel until steamboats (1815) and railways (1850s) began to challenge the royal road. The royal road's importance waned after the 1850s and would not re-emerge as a key means of transportation until the modern highway system of Quebec was created in the 20th century.

See also

Canada East, period after the Act of Union 1840
Former colonies and territories in Canada
French and Indian War
 French and Indian Wars
French colonial empire
List of lieutenant governors of Quebec
National Patriots' Day
Ottawa River timber trade
Province of Quebec (1763–1791)
 Rebellion
Republic of Lower Canada
The Canadas
Timeline of Quebec history
Upper Canada

References

Further reading
 Robert Christie. A History of the Late Province of Lower Canada, Quebec City: T. Cary/R. Montreal: Worthington, 1848–1855 (Internet Archive: All 6 volumes)
 François-Xavier Garneau. History of Canada : from the time of its discovery till the union year, Montreal : J. Lovell, 1860 (Internet Archive: All 3 Volumes)
 Saul, John Ralston. Louis-Hippolyte LaFontaine and Robert Baldwin (2010) online

External links

 
Lower Canada - Encyclopædia Britannica
Gouvernors of Lower Canada - Histoire du Québec
 Lower Canada - Library and Archives Canada
Lower Canada - Quebec Parliament library

 
1841 disestablishments in Canada
History of Quebec by location
British North America
Former British colonies and protectorates in the Americas
1791 establishments in the British Empire
States and territories established in 1791
1841 disestablishments in the British Empire
1791 establishments in North America
1791 establishments in Canada
States and territories disestablished in 1841